The Klingons: A Sourcebook and Character Generation Supplement is a 1983 role-playing game supplement for Star Trek: The Role Playing Game published by FASA, and written by John M. Ford.

Contents
The Klingons: A Sourcebook and Character Generation Supplement provides a complete character generation system for Klingons, plus background material for them.

Reception
Dale L. Kemper reviewed The Klingons in Ares Magazine #17 and commented that "The Klingons game supplement adds a new dimension to the Star Trek gaming experience. It allows you to recreate your favorite Klingons from the TV series to add new nasties to the scene, all in a beautifully detailed background describing new details of the Klingon Empire. This is certainly a must for any avid Star Trek game fan and a welcome addition to FASA's line of Star Trek game products."

Steve Crow reviewed The Klingons in Space Gamer No. 70. Crow commented that "This supplement is the perfect buy for any Star Trek fan, whether he or she buys the roleplaying Star Trek rules or not. For those people who like playing bloodthirsty, backstabbing characters, or those who want a change of pace from the Prime Directive-bound Federation officer, this is the supplement of choice."

Reviews
Different Worlds #42 (May/June, 1986)

References

Role-playing game supplements introduced in 1983
Star Trek: The Role Playing Game supplements
Works by John M. Ford